Syed Ali Raza, known by his takhallus (pen name) of Manzar Bhopali, is an Indian Urdu poet. He was born in Amravati. During his teenage years, Manzar started taking interest in poetry and attended his first mushaira at the age of 17. Over the course of 3 decades, he has penned more than a dozen books in Hindi and Urdu.

Early life
Manzar Bhopali was born on 29 December 1959 in Amrawati, Maharashtra, India. He is the third of four children. His grandfather, Mir Khairat Ali was a hakeem in Achalpur. His father, Mir Abbas Ali worked in the field of Urdu arts and literature and was also a poet. His mother, Tahira Nikhat was an educationist. His family moved from Amrawati to Bhopal when Manzar was very young. Growing up, Manzar was greatly influenced by the poetic culture at his home and the city of Bhopal. He started writing his own couplets when he was fourteen and said his first ghazal at the age of seventeen.

Career
In a career spanning more than three decades, Manzar has recited his poetry in thousands of Mushairas in five continent and two dozen countries. He attended his first international Mushaira in Karachi, Pakistan in 1987. Some of the countries, he has recited his poetry are: USA (26 tours since 1992), Australia (7 tours), Canada (8 tours), Pakistan (18 tours), Iran (2 tours), Saudi Arabia (13 tours), Oman (16 tours), Qatar (11 tours), Dubai (18 tours), Kuwait (8 tours), Sharjah, England, Tanzania, Norway, Malaysia, Thailand, Jordon, Singapore, The Kingdom of Bahrain, and The Netherlands.

Awards and honours

Manzar has been honored with several awards, both in India and abroad. He was given honorary citizenship in Louisville, Kentucky and was felicitated with the key to the city. In April 2018, he was honored with the 'Pride of Madhya Pradesh' Award by the Chief Minister of Madhya Pradesh, for his contribution to Urdu and Hindi literature.

List of Publications
Manzar has published several books, in Urdu, Hindi, and English.

Personal life
Manzar is married  to Tabassum Manzar and lives in Bhopal with his family. He is graduated from Barkatullah University.

References

Urdu-language poets from India
20th-century Indian Muslims
Poets from Madhya Pradesh
20th-century Indian poets
20th-century Indian male writers
1959 births
Living people
Writers from Bhopal